ER/Studio is data architecture and database design  software developed by IDERA, Inc. ER/Studio is compatible with multiple database platforms and is used to create and manage database designs, as well as to document and reuse data assets. In 2015, Embarcadero Technologies was acquired by database and infrastructure management software company IDERA, Inc. Since the acquisition by IDERA, Inc., ER/Studio has been renamed to ER/Studio Data Architect with updated features.

Features
 Logical and physical design support  
 XML Schema generation from either the logical or physical models
 Automation and scripting support
 Forward- and reverse- engineering
 Automated database code generation
 Integration of models and metadata
 Collaboration support including sub model management, repository, “where used”
 Presentation formats include HTML, RTF, XML Schema, PNG, JPEG and DTD Output
 Integrate model metadata with other platforms such as BI, ETL, and other modeling tools.
 Data lineage documentation
 Dimensional modeling 
 Model completion validation
 Automatic foreign key migration
 Capacity planning
Built-in Business Glossary

Overview 
ER/Studio has a computer-aided software engineering tool (or CASE tool). Users can utilize ER/Studio as a way to take conceptual data model and create a logical data model that is not dependent on a specific database technology. This schematic model can be used to create the physical data model. Users can then forward engineer the data definition language required to instantiate the schema for a range of database-management systems. The software includes features to graphically modify the model, including dialog boxes for specifying the number of entity–relationships, database constraints, indexes, and data uniqueness. ER/Studio supports four data modeling languages: IDEF1X, two variants of information technology engineering developed by James Martin, and a form of dimensional modeling notation.

Version History 
Version 16.0:

 Represent master data and transactional concepts with Business Data Objects
 Assign naming standards to models and submodels
 Provide product usage statistics on application use (optional)
 Additional platform support for Azure and Teradata

Version 16.5:

 Universal mappings and enhancements to data modeling and lineage
 Improved relationship diagramming
 Extended database platform support to include DB2 for z/OS v11 and SQL Server 2016
 Model change management enhancements
 Spell check and revisable text format for editable descriptions
 Relationship color inheritence
 Token-based repository check-out and check-in

Version 17.0:

 Updates for several MetaWizard common model bridges
 Numerous bug fixes

Version 17.1:

 Add SQL Server 2017 support for modeling and repository platform
 Extend MongoDB platform support up to version 3.6
 Support for repository on Windows Server 2016 OS
 Multiple bug fixes

Version 18.0:

Enhancements and bug fixes including: 

 Selectable SQL Server driver for Forward and Reverse Engineering
 Oracle 12cR2 has been certified as a deployment platform for the DA Professional repository
 Corrected behavior to eliminate synchronization error when checking diagrams into the DA Professional repository
 Improved repository database connection verification is provided within the repository configuration screens
 Updated repository password encryption
 It is no longer necessary to uninstall and re-install the Repository when upgrading from 16.1 or later versions. The installer will now detect an existing version and upgrade in place

Version 18.1:

 Extension to 7 new MetaWizard platforms including AWS Aurora import bridge, Salesforce Database import bridge, and SAS Bridge SAS Code.
 Data Architect enhancements and bug fixes
 Multiple Team Server usability enhancements and bug fixes

Version 18.2:

 Extended Amazon Redshift cloud data support.
 2 new MetaWizard import bridges including Amazon Web Server (AWS) Aurora Database.
Version 18.3:

 Updated PostgreSQL support

 Additional Redshift features
 Change Notifications in Team Server

Version 18.4:

 Support for Snowflake cloud database

Version 18.5:

 Ui/Ux Facelift
 Aqua Data Studio
 Oracle 18c/19c tolerance support
 Performance Improvements
 Platform Support for Oracle 18c/19c

Platforms 
ER/Studio works on the Windows operating system, ranging from Windows 7 to Windows 10 (64-bit).

Support
 IDEF1X
 Star schema
 Snowflake Schema

See also
 Relational Model
 Denormalization
 Data modeling
 Model-driven architecture
 RDBMS
 XML
 XML Schema
 Data warehouse
 Entity-Relationship model

External links
Official website
Infoworld.com article
Bitpipe.com article
SQL Server magazine article
ER Studio Tutorial

References 

Desktop database application development tools
Data modeling tools
Diagramming software
Database administration tools
1990s software